Sharon McGowan is an American lawyer. She is the legal director and chief strategy officer for Lambda Legal. McGowan was an Obama administration appointee in the role of Acting General Counsel and Deputy General Counsel for Policy at the U.S. Office of Personnel Management. She also served as Principal Deputy Chief of the Appellate Section of the Civil Rights Division in the Department of Justice. In 2019, she was honored with the Stonewall Award, bestowed by the American Bar Association's Commission on Sexual Orientation and Gender Identity.

Early life and education
McGowan was raised in Queens. Her father was an NYPD lieutenant and commanding officer of the hostage negotiation team. Her mother was a secretary at St. Kevin's Roman Catholic Church. McGowan entered storytelling contests as an adolescent and as a teen, partook in her high school forensics club. She came out as gay to her parents in the late '90s.

While earning her undergraduate degree at the University of Virginia, McGowan acted as a help desk clerk to GLAD attorneys. She graduated from the university with honors in 1995, after which she attended Harvard Law School, graduating with honors in 2000.

Career
Early on in her career, McGowan served as a law clerk to the Honorable Norman H. Stahl, U.S. Court of Appeals for the First Circuit, and as a law clerk to the Honorable Helen Ginger Berrigan, U.S. District Court for the Eastern District of Louisiana. McGowan was also an associate at Jenner & Block, Washington, D.C. Early on in her career, McGowan served as Staff Attorney with the ACLU's Lesbian Gay Bisexual Transgender & AIDS Project.

McGowan was hired to serve Lambda Legal in 2017, establishing their offices in Washington, D.C.

In August 2019, McGowan presented at The 2020 Lavender Law® Conference and Career Fair, leading workshops such as "A Comprehensive Look at Transgender Equality in the Workplace," "A Lifetime of Power: How the Trump Administration is Overhauling the Judiciary with Anti-LGBT Judges," and "Title IX and the Future of Protection for Students."

Awards and honors
Stonewall Award (2019)

Personal life
McGowan married in 2010. She and her wife, Emily, a Biden Foundation LGBTQ advisor and former Chief Policy Officer for the Family Equality Council, have two daughters.

In media

Podcasts

Other

References

Harvard Law School alumni
American LGBT rights activists
LGBT lawyers
Lawyers from Queens, New York
University of Virginia alumni
21st-century American lawyers
American lesbians
Obama administration personnel
LGBT people from New York (state)
Living people
Year of birth missing (living people)
American Civil Liberties Union people
American women civil servants
United States Department of Justice officials
21st-century American women lawyers